Pataudi Assembly constituency is one of the 90 assembly constituencies of Haryana, which is a northern state of India. Pataudi is also part of Gurgaon Lok Sabha constituency. It is a reserved seat for the Scheduled caste (SC).

Members of Legislative Assembly

 1967: B. Singh, Indian National Congress
 1968: Ramjiwan Singh, Vishal Haryana Party
 1972: Sisram, Indian National Congress
 1977: Narayan Singh, Vishal Haryana Party
 1982: Hira Lal, Indian National Congress
 1987: Shiv Lal, Lok Dal
 1991: Hira Lal, Janata Party
 1996: Narayan Singh, Haryana Vikas Party
 2000: Ram Bir Singh, Indian National Lok Dal
 2005: Bhupinder Singh, Indian National Congress
 2009: Ganga Ram, Indian National Lok Dal
 2014: Bimla Chaudhary, Bharatiya Janata Party
 2019: Satya Prakash Jaravata, Bharatiya Janata Party

See also

 Pataudi
 List of constituencies of the Haryana Legislative Assembly

References

Assembly constituencies of Haryana
Pataudi
Gurgaon district